The Murphy's crow (Euploea caespes) is a species of nymphalid butterfly in the Danainae subfamily. It is endemic to Indonesia.

References

Euploea
Butterflies of Indonesia
Endemic fauna of Indonesia
Taxonomy articles created by Polbot